George Howard Wilkinson (1 May 1833 – 11 December 1907) was Bishop of Truro 1883-1891 and then of St Andrews, Dunkeld and Dunblane 1893–1907. He was Primus of the Scottish Episcopal Church from 1904, until his death.

Life
Wilkinson was born on 1 May 1833 and educated at Durham School and Oriel College, Oxford. He embarked on an ecclesiastical career with a curacy at Kensington after which he held incumbencies at Seaham Harbour, Auckland, Soho and Eaton Square, a parish in a wealthy part of London, before elevation to the episcopate in 1883.

The founder of the Community of the Epiphany (1883), he died on 11 December 1907.

Family
Wilkinson married, on 14 July 1857, Caroline Charlotte Des Vœux, daughter of lieutenant-colonel Benfield Des Vœux, fourth son of Sir Charles Des Vœux, 1st Baronet; she died on 6 September 1877. They had three sons and five daughters, including Reverend G. G. Wilkinson, and eldest daughter Constance Charlotte Mary Wilkinson, who married in 1902 Reverend Arthur Edward Davies, Chaplain to her father.

Notes

External links

 Bibliographic directory from Project Canterbury

1833 births
People educated at Durham School
Alumni of Oriel College, Oxford
Bishops of Truro
Bishops of Saint Andrews, Dunkeld and Dunblane
19th-century Church of England bishops
19th-century Scottish Episcopalian bishops
1907 deaths
20th-century Scottish Episcopalian bishops
Primuses of the Scottish Episcopal Church